Danny Males (born 29 August 1941) is an Australian boxer. He competed in the men's featherweight event at the 1960 Summer Olympics. At the 1960 Summer Olympics in Rome, he lost to Juan Díaz of Chile by decision.

References

External links
 

1941 births
Living people
Australian male boxers
Olympic boxers of Australia
Boxers at the 1960 Summer Olympics
Boxers from Sydney
Featherweight boxers